Ian Cottage is a British film director and writer.

Small Gestures featuring the filmmaker Derek Jarman was premiered at the 1995 Berlin Film Festival where it received a special Jury mention.  Blue Scars (commissioned for the Southbank Centre) was toured with  British Film Institute's Poem Films in the UK and India with work by Tony Harrison and Maya Deren.

His short film Mangetout was made for the BBC 10 x 10 New Directors scheme and received critic's choice in The Times, Sunday Times and Express newspapers. He was commissioned for the British Film Institute's New Directors scheme with the short Sleep starring Danny John Jules and Josephine Butler.  Sleep was described by Ewen Bremner on Channel 4's Shooting Gallery as “a big, searching serious film, which in my opinion breaks out of the genre and shows us where the new filmmakers are heading”. Other short films for UK national television include Informer and Igloo (commissioned as part of the Arts Council/BBC2's Sound on Film strand).

Cottage has made two films in Estonia, the short The Shoe Tree (winner of the Northern Lights Film Challenge) and Stranger Than Kindness (screened as part of Britspotting and shown on Estonian television ETV).  He also wrote and directed Keel which premiered at the 2009 Edinburgh Film Festival and featured on the UK Film Council's Best Short Films DVD. In 2013, he directed Spin for Channel 4 Random Acts strand, premiering at the BALTIC Centre for Contemporary Art.

At present, Cottage is in post-production on the psychological thriller Bosc, shot in Northern Spain.

Cottage ran the Northern Production Fund for Northern Arts from 1999-2001.  During his time at NPF, the agency supported award-winning films including Neil Marshall’s Dog Soldiers, Sarah Gavron's This Little Life (BBC Dennis Potter Award) and Duane Hopkin's Love Me Or Leave Me Alone. He devised and exec-produced 5 half-hour dramas for ITV Tyne Tees Hothouse strand (two winning regional Royal Television Society awards) and launched Northern Film and Media's successful short film strand Stingers.

Roger Redgate  provided the score for a number of Cottage's early short films including Small Gestures, Mangetout and Igloo.

Filmography
Small Gestures. featuring Derek Jarman (1995). Special Jury Mention at the Berlin International Film Festival. Represented by British Council at international film festivals.
Blue Scars (1995). Toured with B.F.I Poem Film programme in UK and India. Represented by British Council at international film festivals.
Mangetout (1996). Commissioned by the BBC for the 10 x 10 series.  Critics choice in the Times, Sunday Times, Daily Express and Time Out magazine. Represented by British Council at international film festivals.
Informer (1997). Commissioned by Channel 4 in association with Common Features. Critics Choice in Time Out magazine.
Igloo (1998). Commissioned by the BBC/Arts Council of England for BBC 2's Sound on Film. Represented by British Council at international film festivals.
Sleep (1998) Commissioned by the British Film Institute and Channel 4. Screened on Channel 4 and Film4. Represented by British Council at international film festivals.
The Shoe Tree (2003) – Screened as part of Future Shorts 2007. Represented by British Council at international film festivals.
Exodus 20 (2004). Commissioned by Creative Partnerships
Stranger Than Kindness (2006). Commissioned by Creative Partnerships. Premiered at Monte Carlo International Comedy Film Festival. Screened as part of Britspotting – shown in Berlin, Potsdam, Stuttgart, Munich, Nantes, London.  Screened on Estonian television ETV.
Damage (2007). Commissioned by Creative Partnerships.
Keel (2008) – Commissioned by UK Film Council. Screened in Best of British Short Film competition at the Edinburgh International Film Festival 2009.
Spin (2013) - Commissioned by Channel 4 and the BALTIC as part of the Random Acts series. Screened on Channel 4 and premiered at the BALTIC. 
Bosc (2019) - Feature film. Currently in post production.

External links

Year of birth missing (living people)
Living people
British film directors